The Midlands Collegiate Athletic Conference (MCAC) was an intercollegiate athletic conference that competed in National Association of Intercollegiate Athletics. Members of the conference were located in the Midwest United States and were located in Kansas, Missouri, Nebraska, Iowa, Arkansas, and Oklahoma.

History

Commissioners
Since 1994 when MCAC was established, to the time it dissolved in 2015, the conference only had two commissioners.

 Carl R. Clapp (1994–1995)
 Al Waller (1996–2015)

Conference presidents
The conference has board made up of representatives from the member institutions, and one person from a school is selected as the board's president for two years.

 Larry Kramer, Avila College (1994–96)
 Paul Mills, Wesleyan College (1996–98)
 Sr. Tarcisia Roths, Newman University (1998–2000)
 Wayne Baker, York College (2000–02)
 Aidan Dunleavy, Newman University (2002–04)
 Ben Johnson, Peru State College (2004–06)
 Wayne Baker, York College (2006–08)
 Maryanne Stevens, College of Saint Mary (2008–10)
 Steve Eckman, York College (2010–12)
 Hal Hoxie Central Christian College (2012–15)

Chronological timeline
 1994 - The Midlands Collegiate Athletic Conference (MCAC) was founded. Charter members included Avila College (now Avila University), Bellevue College (now Bellevue University), Bartlesville Wesleyan College (now Oklahoma Wesleyan University), the School of the Ozarks (now the College of the Ozarks), Park College (now Park University), the Saint Mary College of Kansas (now the University of Saint Mary of Kansas), the College of Saint Mary of Nebraska and York College, effective beginning the 1994–95 academic year.
 1999 - Saint Mary (Ks.) left the MCAC to join the Kansas Collegiate Athletic Conference (KCAC), effective after the 1998–99 academic year.
 1999 - Newman University of Kansas joined the MCAC, effective in the 1999–2000 academic year.
 2000 - Avila left the MCAC to join the Heart of America Athletic Conference (HAAC), effective after the 1999–2000 academic year.
 2000 - Peru State College joined the MCAC, effective in the 2000–01 academic year.
 2001 - Haskell Indian Nations University joined the MCAC, effective in the 2001–02 academic year.
 2002 - Central Christian College of Kansas joined the MCAC, effective in the 2002–03 academic year.
 2006 - Newman left the MCAC to join the Division II ranks of the National Collegiate Athletic Association (NCAA), primarily to compete in the Heartland Conference, effective after the 2005–06 academic year.
 2009 - Park U. left the MCAC to join the American Midwest Conference, effective after the 2008–09 academic year.
 2010 - Southwestern Christian University joined the MCAC, effective in the 2010–11 academic year.
 2011 - Peru State left the MCAC to join the HAAC, effective after the 2010–11 academic year.
 2011 - Central Baptist College joined the MCAC, effective in the 2011–12 academic year.
 2012 - Waldorf College joined the MCAC, effective in the 2012–13 academic year.
 2013 - Southwestern Christian left the MCAC to join the Sooner Athletic Conference (SAC), effective after the 2012–13 academic year.
 2015 - The MCAC ceased operations as an athletic conference, effective after the 2014–15 academic year; as many schools left to find new conference homes, effective beginning the 2015–16 academic year: Central Baptist to the American Midwest, Saint Mary (Neb.) to the Great Plains Athletic Conference (GPAC), Central Christian (who would later join the SAC in the 2017–18 school year) and the College of the Ozarks to the Association of Independent Institutions (AII; basically an NAIA independent school), and Oklahoma Wesleyan and York (Neb.) to the KCAC (York joined later in the 2016–17 school year after spending a season as an independent school), and Bellevue and Waldorf to the North Star Athletic Association (NSAA).

Member schools

Final members
The MCAC had nine full members in the conference's final season, most were private schools:

Notes

Former members
The MCAC had six other full members during the conference's tenure, most were private schools:

Notes

Membership timeline

Conference sports

The Midlands Collegiate Athletic Conference fielded 11 sports (5 men's and 6 women's), which includes:

References

External links